Upendranath Biswas or U. N. Biswas is an Indian politician, caste historian and a retired Indian Police Service (IPS) officer. He served as the Minister of Backward Classes Welfare in the Government of West Bengal from 2011 to 2016 in the First Banerjee ministry.

Early life
He was born to Nibaran Chandra Biswas at faridpur resent, vill ulpur, upazila Gopalganj, Jilla Gopalganj in Bangladesh. He belongs to Namasudra family and follows Ambedkarite ideology. He completed his Ph.D. in sociology from the University of Calcutta in 1986. He got converted into Buddhism and is one of the few lawmakers belonging to the religion, from West Bengal.

As a civil servant
He joined the West Bengal Police as an IPS officer in 1968, serving as a DSP in charge of an EFR Company, a Subdivision, Addl. SP of District HQ, S.P of West Dinajpur, SSP in the West Bengal CID, and the Joint Director in CBI, his honest investigation report to the court was changed with a milder one written by his deputy Ranjit Sinha by the head of the CBI, Joginder Singh to please the political establishment, for which the CBI received strictures from the court.

He retired as the additional director of India's Central Bureau of Investigation (CBI), which he served as an officer of the Indian Police Service (West Bengal cadre, 1968 batch). He first became a news-maker by relentlessly pursuing former Chief Ministers of Bihar, Jagannath Mishra and Lalu Prasad Yadav in the  Fodder scam as the joint Director (East), CBI.

His efficiency and honesty were always on the top. He was involved in detecting and resolving many scams when he held the Office of the Joint Director, Central Bureau of Investigation (CBI). The most popular of these was perhaps the scam for Chara Ghotala in which he caught the corrupt politician Lalu Prasad Yadav and sent him to jail also. Even after threats to his life from different politicians, he did his duties perfectly up to the end.

In 2002, he had retired from the CBI as Additional director.

Politics
After retirement from his job, he joined the All India Trinamool Congress party and won from Bagda in Bongaon subdivision. He was an MLA, elected from the Bagda constituency in the 2011 West Bengal state assembly election. He has served as the Minister for Backward Class Welfare in the Government of West Bengal from 2011 to 2016. During the 2021 West Bengal election, he resigned from Trinamool Congress.

Whistleblowing
In 2022, in a Facebook post, he first exposed the School Service Commission (SSC) TET scam in West Bengal.

Controversy
He created a controversy by seeking the help of the Indian Army in rushing to arrest Lalu Prasad Yadav,  following which he was harassed by his department and the political establishment.

References 

 

West Bengal MLAs 2011–2016
Living people
Indian Buddhists
20th-century Buddhists
21st-century Buddhists
Converts to Buddhism from Hinduism
State cabinet ministers of West Bengal
1942 births